Walter Gresham may refer to:

 Walter Q. Gresham (1832–1895), American statesman and jurist
 Walter Gresham (Texas politician) (1841–1920)